Toy Biz (also stylized as ToyBiz), was a toy company which later became a subsidiary of Marvel Entertainment and was renamed to Marvel Toys. It was best known for producing action figures and toys and holding the Marvel Comics license from 1990 to 2006.

The company originated in Montreal, Quebec, as Charan Toys. In 1988, Charan Toys was renamed Toy Biz and became an American firm. In 1990, it obtained the master toy license for the Marvel Entertainment Group, and by 1993 became partially owned by Marvel. In 1998, Toy Biz merged with Marvel Entertainment Group to bring it out of bankruptcy, with the two companies merging and creating Marvel Enterprises. Toy Biz was absorbed into Marvel Enterprises, and its main toy subsidiary was renamed Toy Biz, as consumers were familiar with the brand. In 2005, Marvel Enterprises was renamed Marvel Entertainment to reflect the Marvel Cinematic Universe. In addition to this, its toy operations were renamed Marvel Toys on all properties by the end of 2006.

Due to Marvel Entertainment's bankruptcy, the company became financially unable to continue to run the Marvel Toys subsidiary, with Hasbro ultimately purchasing the master toy license for Marvel Comics, releasing its first products in January 2007. Marvel Toys attempted to survive with non-Marvel owned characters throughout 2007, though still faced financial problems. The website for Marvel Toys became inactive in late 2007.

History

Late 20th century to 1997

Charan Toys (Canadian company)
The company's original forerunner, Canadian company Chantex, Inc., was founded in the late 19th century by the Zuckerman family. The business grew from $.16 million in sales to sales of $4.5 million in 1980. In 1980, Chantex merged with Earl Takefman's Randim Marketing, Inc., a school supply manufacturer and wholesaler, to become Charan Industries Inc. Its Charan Toy, Inc. subsidiary became a leading licensing toy company in 1985. In addition to toys, Charan implemented brands in other areas, including acquiring a hockey equipment brand in the mid-1980s.

Toy Biz (American company)
In 1990, Charan, including the Toy Biz subsidiary, was purchased by businessman Ike Perlmutter. In 1993, Toy Biz made a deal for "exclusive, perpetual, royalty-free licenses" of Marvel Characters for 46 percent of Toy Biz equity. Avi Arad, a toy designer and comic book fan joined Toy Biz that same year.

Toy Biz continued licensing outside brands, including DC Comics characters, producing goods such as the Batman (1989 film)'s Batmobile and some action figures, Hercules: The Legendary Journeys and Xena: Warrior Princess action figures based on the Action Pack television series shown on many New World Television stations. Also, agreements with Gerber and NASCAR were acquired. In 1995, Toy Biz acquired Spectra Star, Inc. and Quest Aerospace Education, Inc., both toy companies. Toy Biz started up its Classic Heroes candy division in 1996, which sold candy/toy combinations using mainly Marvel characters. The company also entered the electronic learning aids (ELA) segment of the toy industry in 1996 with a licensing agreement with Apple Computer.

Toy Biz partially acquired Marvel Entertainment Group. In the late 1990s, Marvel Entertainment Group filed for bankruptcy and became the subject of a battle for control in bankruptcy court. The company was salvaged in 1997 and merged with Toy Biz in 1998. The new company became Marvel Enterprises, and Toy Biz became a division of the new company.

1998 to 2007

Toy Biz as a subsidiary
In 1999, Toy Biz ventured into professional wrestling, acquiring the master toy license to World Championship Wrestling (WCW). After two years, the license deal was cut short, due to WCW being purchased by the World Wrestling Federation in 2001. The company also licensed products for Total Nonstop Action Wrestling (TNA), Curious George and Code Lyoko.

Toy Biz Worldwide Ltd. 
In 2001, Marvel Enterprises licensed the rights to the 'Toy Biz' name to a Hong Kong-based toy manufacturer, Toy Biz Worldwide Ltd. Toy Biz also outsourced much of the manufacturing to Toy Biz Worldwide Ltd.

Marvel Entertainment licensing agreement to Hasbro
In January 2006, Marvel Entertainment signed a five-year licensing agreement with Hasbro Inc. for $205 million, giving Hasbro the right to make toys and games based on Marvel Comic licenses. As a result of this, Marvel Entertainment prematurely terminated its agreements with Toy Biz Worldwide Ltd, by a year. As a result of the early termination, Marvel Entertainment paid Toy Biz Worldwide Ltd. a penalty of between $13–16 million USD.

Throughout 2007, the division struggled to stay afloat without the Marvel Comic licenses. The company introduced a series called the Legendary Comic Book Heroes – making action figures of non-Marvel Comic characters, though it suffered with poor sales. The company also furthered its TNA Wrestling and Curious George lines. Marvel Entertainment quietly began to close the division. In late 2007, the company's website shut down.

Legacy 

 Following the demise of Marvel Toys, TNA Wrestling signed its master toy license with Jakks Pacific in early 2008, to release products in mid-2010.
 In 2022, Hasbro released updated versions of Toy Biz's first wave of Marvel Legends figures to celebrate the line's twentieth anniversary.

See also
Avi Arad
Marvel Legends
Toy Biz v. United States, a court case that determined that Toy Biz action figures were toys, not dolls.

References

External links
ComicFigs.Net (formerly Marvel Legends.net) 
Legendary Comic Book Heroes

Marvel Entertainment
1988 establishments in Quebec
2007 disestablishments in New York (state)
Canadian companies established in 1988
American companies disestablished in 2007
Toy companies established in 1988
Manufacturing companies disestablished in 2007
Toy companies of the United States
Toys based on comics
Defunct manufacturing companies based in New York City